Azerbaijani cuisine refers to the cooking styles and dishes of the Republic of Azerbaijan. The cuisine developed significantly due to its diversity of agriculture, from abundant grasslands which historically allowed for a culture of pastoralism to develop, as well as to the unique geographical location of Azerbaijan, which is situated on the crossroads of Europe and Asia with an access to the Caspian Sea. The location has enabled the people to develop a varied diet rich in produce, milk products, and meat, including beef, mutton, fish and game. The location, which was contended over by many historical kingdoms, khanates, and empires, also meant that Azerbaijani cuisine was influenced by the culinary traditions of multiple different cultures, such as Turkic, Iranian, and Eastern European.

History and features of Azerbaijan national cuisine

Azerbaijan's national cuisine is closer to Middle Eastern cuisine due to the taste and preparation of the dishes, as well as adding a dark spice and flavor additives.
Contemporary Azerbaijan cuisine retains the traditional methods of preparing dishes while incorporating modern cooking.

Azerbaijani dishes have traditionally been cooked with copper utensils and cookware. Copper bowls and plates are still commonly used as serving dishes.

Azerbaijani cuisine utilizes fruits and vegetables such as aubergine, tomato, sweet pepper, spinach, cabbage, onion, sorrel, beet, radish, cucumber, and green beans. Rice and products made from flour are widely used in national cuisine. Fresh herbs, including mint, coriander, dill, basil, parsley, tarragon, leek, chive, thyme, marjoram, green onion, and watercress often accompany main dishes. The majority of national dishes are made with lamb, beef and poultry meat. Dishes prepared of minced meat are also prevalent. The sea, lakes and rivers of Azerbaijan are abundant with different fish species, particularly the white sturgeon. Sturgeons are widely used in preparation of national dishes. Particularly, the Caspian Sea is home to many edible species of fish, including the sturgeon, Caspian salmon, kutum, sardines, grey mullet, and others. Black caviar from the Caspian Sea is one of Azerbaijan's best-known luxury foods.

The typical Azerbaijani meal involves three courses. One of the basic dishes of Azerbaijani cuisine is plov prepared with saffron-covered rice, served with various herbs and greens, a combination distinct from those found in Uzbek plovs. Other second courses include a variety of kebabs and shashlik, including lamb, beef, chicken, duck and fish (baliq) kebabs. Sturgeon, a common fish, is normally skewered and grilled as a shashlik, served with a tart pomegranate sauce called narsharab. Dried fruits and walnuts are used in many dishes. The traditional condiments are salt, black pepper, sumac, and especially saffron, which is grown on the Absheron Peninsula domestically. The third courses include soups, of which there are more than 30 types. These include kufta bozbash, piti prepared of meat and dovga, ovdukh, dogramach, bolva prepared of greens and yoghurt. Some soups are served in national or interesting and unusually-shaped bowls.

Black tea is the national beverage, and is drunk after food is eaten. It is also offered to guests as a gesture of welcome, often accompanied by fruit preserves.

Breakfast 
The Azerbaijani breakfast is heavy in dairy products such as butter, various types of white cheese, and cream, as well as honey, tandoori bread and eggs, traditionally prepared into kuku, but alternatively, also scrambled. Eastern European breakfast traditions which were adopted under the Russian Empire and the Soviet Union are also occasionally seen in Azerbaijan households, with foods such as kasha, porridge, quark and crepes included on the breakfast table.

Light snacks

Azerbaijani cuisine has a number of light snacks and side dishes to open or accompany the main meals: a plate of green leaves called goy, pieces of chorek (bread), choban (a tomato and cucumber salad), white cheese or qatik (sour yogurt) and turshu (pickles). This culinary tradition is comparable to Turkish meze. The richer main courses such as soups, meats and plov are served afterwards.

Dishes

Meat

Historically, Azerbaijani cuisine included large amounts of beef and game. Consumption of camel meat was also widespread, although it has become increasingly rare in modern times. In order to preserve meat, it was historically jerked, or alternatively, roasted and stuffed into jars or animal stomachs. Apart from the conventional cuts of meat, Azerbaijani cuisine features the use of head, legs, tails and intestines of animals in numerous traditional dishes.

Azerbaijani cuisine features a wide variety of traditional meat dishes such as bozbash (parchabozbash, kuftebozbash, qovurmabozbash), piti (gence piti, sheki piti) khash, bash-ayaq (kelle-pacha), kelepir, soyutma, bozport, buglama, bozartma, and a variety of different kebabs. A variety of lamb dishes are also commonly eaten, traditionally during celebrations such as Nowruz. Meatball dishes and forms of dolma are regularly eaten as well. On particularly special occasions, local goose, turkey, duck, quail and pheasant meats are also cooked and consumed.

Azerbaijani cuisine also features a variety of seafood, especially fish which is obtained from the Caspian Sea as well as the Kura and Aras rivers. Fish is prepared in a variety of ways: stuffed, chopped, dried, grilled, fried, boiled, cooked in the oven, cooked on skewers, cooked in tandoors, cooked into plovs, and in other ways depending on the occasion and personal preferences.

Soups
Soups in Azerbaijan tend to have a thicker consistency and a larger ratio of dry ingredients to broth. A common feature of numerous Azerbaijani soups is that the soup serves the role of both the first and second courses – the soup is served in a large portion and the broth is drunk first as a starter, and then the dry ingredients of the soup such as the potatoes, meat, chickpeas and large vegetable chunks are consumed as a second course together with bread.

Another characteristic featured in several Azerbaijani soups is the use of finely cut mutton tails which are added soups. Tomato paste and tomato puree are rarely used in Azerbaijani soups and instead are substituted with fresh local tomatoes during the summer. During winter, local tomatoes are not widely available and so frequently substituted with dried cherries. Spices such as saffron and turmeric powder are also traditionally used in Azerbaijani soups.

Types of plov

Plov is one of the most widespread dishes in Azerbaijan and there are over 200 types of plovs in Azerbaijani cuisine. They are usually prepared with local vegetables, meats and spices. In Azerbaijani tradition, it is customary that the household prepares a plov for guests visiting the house. They are typically served in a large metal or porcelain bowl covered with a lid to keep it warm. The type of rice used to make the plov varies from one recipe to another and depends on personal preferences. Since plov is a heavy, fatty food, it is traditionally served together with sour drinks such as ayran, black tea with lemon, or verjuice. Plovs have different names depending on the main ingredients accompanying the rice:

Azerbaijani plov consists of three distinct components, served simultaneously but on separate platters: rice (warm, never hot), gara, fried meat, dried fruits, eggs, or fish prepared as an accompaniment to rice, and aromatic herbs. Rice is not mixed with the other components even when eating plov.

Spices 
Spices play an important role in Azerbaijani cuisine, especially saffron which is used in over 50 national dishes. Other spices widely used in Azerbaijani cuisine include anise, cumin, cinnamon, thyme, coriander seeds, curcuma, sumac, caraway, bay leaves, mint, dill, parsley, celery, tarragon and basil.

Desserts

 

Typical Azerbaijani desserts are sticky, syrup-saturated pastries such as pakhlava and Shaki halva. The former, a layer of chopped nuts sandwiched between mats of thread-like fried dough, is a specialty of Shaki in northwest Azerbaijan. Other traditional pastries include shekerbura (crescent-shaped and filled with nuts), peshmak (tube-shaped candy made out of rice, flour, and sugar), and girmapadam (pastry filled with chopped nuts).

Sweets are generally bought from a pastry shop and eaten at home or on special occasions such as weddings and wakes. The usual conclusion to a restaurant meal is a plate of fresh fruit that is in season, such as plums, cherries, apricots, or grapes.

In March 2009, Azerbaijani bakers achieved an entry in the CIS book of records for baking the biggest and heaviest pakhlava in the CIS, weighing about 3 tons. More than 7 thousand eggs, 350 kg of nuts, 20 kg of almonds, 350 kg of sugar, and the same amount of flour was used in the preparation of the pastry.

Dairy products 

Milk and dairy products play an important role in the Azerbaijani diet. Milk, butter, cream, sour cream, yogurt, cottage cheese, motal cheese, buttermilk, dovga, ayran, qatiq, suzme, and other dairy products are regularly consumed in the morning, as a snack, and even incorporated into lunch and dinner. Cow's milk is most often used to produce local dairy products, however sheep's milk is also sometimes used and goats' milk is consumed for its perceived health benefits. Rural communities in Azerbaijan produce local butter, buttermilk and cheeses using traditional churning techniques.

Breads

Different types of bread are baked in Azerbaijan: flat, rolling, flatbread, lavash, sengek, xamrali, thick, thin, crepes, cakes, and tandoor bread. In the Middle Ages, tandoor ovens were one of the common facilities of the population who lived in Old City (Icheri Sheher). This has been discovered during the archaeological excavations in different areas of Old City.
During the meeting held in Ethiopia, the UNESCO Intergovernmental Committee for the Safeguarding of the Intangible Cultural Heritage decided to include lavash in the Representative List of the Intangible Cultural Heritage of the organization.

Non-alcoholic beverages
Black tea is Azerbaijan's national drink. Azerbaijani people usually prefer tea made in a samovar.

Ayran is a cold yogurt beverage mixed with salt.

An Azerbaijani sherbet is a sweet cold drink made of fruit juice mixed or boiled with sugar, often perfumed with rose water. Sherbets (not to be confused with sorbet ices) are of Iranian origin and they may differ greatly in consistency, from very thick and jam-like (as in Tajik cuisine) to very light and liquid, as in Azerbaijan. Sherbets are typically prepared in the following natural flavors:

 Lemon
 Pomegranate
 Strawberry
 Cherry
 Apricot
 Mint

Locally made brands of bottled water include the following:

Alcoholic beverages 
Unlike multiple other countries with a predominantly Muslim population, alcohol consumption in Azerbaijan is entirely legal, and a variety of alcoholic drinks, both locally produced and imported can be found in shops and bars across the country. Although alcohol consumption in Azerbaijan is relatively moderate, alcoholic drinks still play a part in nightlife, festivities and celebrations.

Wine 

Azerbaijan produces wine locally. In the Khanlar district of the Azerbaijan Republic, for example, archeologists have found jars buried with the remains of wine dating back to the 2nd millennium BC. Greek historian Strabo who had traveled to northern Azerbaijan (Caucasian Albania at the time) described cultivation of crops of grapes as so abundant that the residents were not able to harvest them. One of the most ancient and notable regions known for its wine-making produce is Tovuz in northwestern Azerbaijan. Archeological findings in this region speak of ancient vessels for wine storage, stones and remains of tartaric acid used for wine-growing.

The contemporary wine-making in Azerbaijan is seen in Ganja-Qazakh and Shirvan economic zones. Vineyards in these regions account to about 7% of the country's cultivated land. The regions are famous for 17 vines and 16 table grape varieties, the most common of the wine cultivars being Pinot Noir. In Azerbaijan, wines made from grapes are called sharab (Azerbaijani: şərab) while wines from other fruits including apples, pomegranates and mulberry are called nabiz (Azerbaijani: nəbiz). Other sorts are called chakhyr (Azerbaijani: çaxır). According to historians, there are more than 450 different categories of wild grape found in Azerbaijan which had been used for wine-making throughout the history of Azerbaijan.

Beer 
Azerbaijan is a small-scale domestic beer producer and various types of beer, locally produced and imported, are widely available in shops and supermarkets across the country. Pubs serving beer can also be found scattered across Baku, where locals typically consume beer together with various snacks such as crepes, croutons, fried fish or chicken, and salted nuts.

Vodka 
Vodka is another common beverage that can be found in Azerbaijani stores and bars. The practice of consuming vodka is a part of the Eastern European influence left in Azerbaijan after nearly two centuries of being a part of the Russian Empire and the Soviet Union.

Pickles 
Consumption of pickled foods, particularly pickled vegetables, is common in Azerbaijan. A plate of pickled foods is served as one of the snacks prior to the main dish, or alternatively as a side dish.

Fruit preserves
Fruit preserves of all kinds, traditionally served alongside tea, are a ubiquitous sighting at family gatherings and festivities in Azerbaijan. Jams, jellies, and especially fruit conserves are eaten in between sips of tea or sometimes placed directly into tea as a sweetener and a flavoring.

See also 

Culture of Azerbaijan
Dishes from the Caucasus

References

External links

 AZ Cookbook: Food from Azerbaijan and Beyond
 Proverbs about Food in Azerbaijan, Azerbaijan International, Autumn 2000, pp. 36–37.
 Food! Glorious Food!, Special issue of Azerbaijan International, Autumn 2000.
 Azerbaijani dishes: photographs and descriptions
 Azerbaijani cuisine: descriptions of dishes by category on advantour.com
 Cuisine of Azerbaijan based on the book Azerbaijani Cooking published in Baku  (archived 16 February 2009)
 Selected recipes from Azerbaijani cuisine

 
Caucasian cuisine